Kristin Kuhns Alexandre (born July 15, 1948, in Dayton, Ohio; died September 12, 2021 in New York City of Leukemia )   was an American writer, journalist, author, screenwriter, and producer. She is best known for her work as a WGA screenwriter and her role as executive producer for the action thriller, "Altar Rock," directed by Andrzej Bartkowiak.

Biography

Kristin Alexandre was born and raised in Dayton, Ohio, where her family has an extended history. Alexandre later left Dayton to attend and graduate from Sweet Briar College. Her graphic novel series, Nuncio and the Gypsy Girl, features Neci Stans, a Dayton gypsy princess whose love for Ezra Crawford, a Dayton aviator and composer, exposes her to danger.

From 1968-1978, Kristin was married to William Norris Hubbard. Alexandre and her husband were among the group of organizers that headed up the New York City activities for the first Earth Day on April 22, 1970. She was the speaker Coordinator for the NYC event.

Alexandre went on to marry Richard Warren Gerrity in 1981. Today, Alexandre is a resident of Delray Beach, Florida where she lives with her husband of 30 years, DeWitt Loomis Alexandre,  an investment advisor.

Career

In addition to her novel writing and film work, Alexandre has written feature stories for The Christian Science Monitor, Ingenue Magazine, Town & Country Magazine, and The New York Daily News.  She also wrote a weekly column called "The Young Slant" for The Dayton Journal Herald. Alexandre's first writing experience was with The Kettering-Oakwood Times when she documented her experiences with The Experiment in International Living through a series of columns she submitted while living in France.

Alexandre also worked as a publicist for the advertising agency Ammirati Puris Lintas, the Puerto Rico Economic Development Administration, Rums of Puerto Rico and Sweet Briar College. She was editor of the corporate magazine for Champion International U.S. Plywood and C.I.T. Financial Corporation.

In the early 1970s, Alexandre was a reporter on one episode of WNET's 51st State. She  is also President of The Kuhns Investment Co. LLC, a small, privately held family investment company located in Dayton, Ohio.

Alexandre worked as a producer and writer for various film projects and is a featured writer on The Black List.

Filmography

Bibliography

References

 Kristin Gerrity and DeWitt Alexandre Jr. Married
 Earth Day History
 Celebrate Earth Day 2011
 Dance and Theatre
 Art And Entertainment | Art Online

External links
KristinAlexandre.com

1946 births
2021 deaths
Writers from Dayton, Ohio
Sweet Briar College alumni
American women journalists
Journalists from Ohio
21st-century American women